OpenMS is an open-source project for data analysis and processing in mass spectrometry and is released under the 3-clause BSD licence. It supports most common operating systems including Microsoft Windows, MacOS and Linux.

OpenMS has tools for analysis of proteomics data, providing algorithms for signal processing, feature finding (including de-isotoping), visualization in 1D (spectra or chromatogram level), 2D and 3D, map mapping and peptide identification. It supports label-free and isotopic-label based quantification (such as iTRAQ and TMT and SILAC). OpenMS also supports metabolomics workflows and targeted analysis of DIA/SWATH data. Furthermore, OpenMS provides tools for the analysis of cross linking data, including protein-protein, protein-RNA and protein-DNA cross linking. Lastly, OpenMS provides tools for analysis of RNA mass spectrometry data.

History 
OpenMS was originally released in 2007 in version 1.0 and was described in two articles published in Bioinformatics in 2007 and 2008 and has since seen continuous releases.
In 2009, the visualization tool TOPPView was published and in 2012, the workflow manager and editor TOPPAS was described. In 2013, a complete high-throughput label-free analysis pipeline using OpenMS 1.8 was described and compared with similar, proprietary software (such as MaxQuant and Progenesis QI). The authors conclude that "[...] all three software solutions produce adequate and largely comparable quantification results; all have some weaknesses, and none can outperform the other two in every aspect that we examined. However, the performance of OpenMS is on par with that of its two tested competitors [...]".

The OpenMS 1.10 release contained several new analysis tools, including OpenSWATH (a tool for targeted DIA data analysis), a metabolomics feature finder and a TMT analysis tool. Furthermore, full support for TraML 1.0.0 and the search engine MyriMatch were added. The OpenMS 1.11 release was the first release to contain fully integrated bindings to the Python programming language (termed pyOpenMS). In addition, new tools were added to support QcML (for quality control) and for metabolomics accurate mass analysis. Multiple tools were significantly improved with regard to memory and CPU performance.

With OpenMS 2.0, released in April 2015, the project provides a new version that has been completely cleared of GPL code and uses git (in combination with GitHub) for its version control and ticketing system. Other changes include support for mzIdentML, mzQuantML and mzTab while improvements in the kernel allow for faster access to data stored in mzML and provide a novel API for accessing mass spectrometric data. In 2016, the new features of OpenMS 2.0 were described in an article in Nature Methods.

OpenMS is currently developed with contributions from the group of Knut Reinert at the Free University of Berlin, the group of Oliver Kohlbacher at the University of Tübingen and the group of Ruedi Aebersold at ETH Zurich.

Features 

OpenMS provides a set of over 100 different executable tools than can be chained together into pipelines for mass spectrometry data analysis (the TOPP Tools). It also provides visualization tools for spectra and chromatograms (1D), mass spectrometric heat maps (2D m/z vs RT) as well as a three-dimensional visualization of a mass spectrometry experiment. Finally, OpenMS also provides a C++ library (with bindings to Python available since 1.11) for LC/MS data management and analyses accessible to developers to create new tools and implement their own algorithms using the OpenMS library. OpenMS is free software available under the 3-clause BSD licence (previously under the LGPL).

Among others, it provides algorithms for signal processing, feature finding (including de-isotoping), visualization, map mapping and peptide identification. It supports label-free and isotopic-label based quantification (such as iTRAQ and TMT and SILAC).

TOPPView is a viewer that allows visualization of mass spectrometric data on MS1 and MS2 level as well as in 3D; additionally it also displays chromatographic data from SRM experiments (in version 1.10). OpenMS is compatible with current and upcoming Proteomics Standard Initiative (PSI) formats for mass spectrometric data.

Releases

See also 
 ProteoWizard
 Trans-Proteomic Pipeline
 Mass spectrometry software

References

External links 
 OpenMS Project Homepage
 

Free science software
Bioinformatics software
Mass spectrometry software
Proteomics
Software using the BSD license